Gymnophryxe nudigena is a Palaearctic species of tachinid flies in the genus Gymnophryxe of the family Tachinidae.

Distribution
Palaearctic: Israel, Algeria.

References

Diptera of Europe
Diptera of Asia
Exoristinae
Insects described in 1922
Taxa named by Joseph Villeneuve de Janti